Griffeth is a surname. Notable people with the surname include:

Bill Griffeth (born 1956), American financial journalist
Lee Griffeth (1925–2007), American baseball player
Nancy D. Griffeth (born 1945), American computer scientist
Simone Griffeth (born 1950), American actress

See also
Griffeth-Pendley House, historic house in Jasper, Georgia, U.S.